Rasmus Boysen (born 14 October 1992) is a Danish retired handball player.

Boysen has appeared for the Danish youth national team, with whom he participated in the U21 World Championship in Bosnia in 2013. He has played 15 youth national matches for Denmark.

Rasmus Boysen has participated in the EHF Cup with Skjern Håndbold twice and once with Ribe-Esbjerg HH. He also has participated in the EHF Champions League with Elverum HH.

In the season - 2016/17 - Boysen secured his team Ribe-Esbjerg HH a spot in the playoffs for the first time in the history of the club, with a goal in the last second of the home game against the League rivals SønderjyskE.

References

Danish male handball players
1992 births
Living people